Clemens Baeumker (16 September 1853 – 7 October 1924) was a German historian of philosophy.

Baeumker was born in Paderborn to a gymnasium teacher. He studied philosophy, theology, and philology in Paderborn and later at the University of Münster, from which he obtained a doctorate in 1877. From 1879 he was a gymnasium lecturer in Münster.

Through the efforts of Georg von Hertling he was appointed professor of philosophy at the University of Breslau in 1883, where he remained until 1900. In that year he moved to the University of Bonn, and in 1903 to the University of Strasbourg, where he filled the chair vacated by Wilhelm Windelband. In 1912 he moved to the University of Munich, filling the chair vacated by his friend von Hertling. He died in Munich in 1924.

Baeumker was known in particular for his studies in the history of medieval philosophy.

Selected works 
 Das Problem der Materie in der griechischen Philosophie, 1890
 The founder of the "Beiträge zur Geschichte der Philosophie des Mittelalters" (since 1891)
 Die europäische Philosophie des Mittelalters, 1909
 Roger Bacons Naturphilosophie, 1916
 Der Platonismus im Mittelalter, 1916
 Petrus von Hibernia der Jugendlehrer des Thomas von Aquino unde seine Disputation vor König Manfred, Munich, 1920.

References
 

1853 births
1924 deaths
German philosophers
People from Paderborn
People from the Province of Westphalia
University of Münster alumni
Academic staff of the Ludwig Maximilian University of Munich
Academic staff of the University of Bonn
German historians of philosophy
German male non-fiction writers